Nasser Nouraei is a retired Iranian football player.

Club career
He played for Homa F.C. and Persepolis F.C.

With Homa F.C. he reached the third place in the Iranian league in 1975, in 1976 he reached the second place with Homa in the Iranian league alongside national team colleagues like Hassan Nayebagha, Sahameddin Mirfakhraei, Alireza Khorshidi and Alireza Azizi.

After the Iranian Revolution he won with Homa the Iranian nationwide tournament Espandi Cup in 1979.

With Persepolis F.C. he won the Tehran Hazfi Cup in 1982, and reached the second place in 1983.

International career
He played for the Iran national football team and participated at the 1978 FIFA World Cup and 1976 Olympic Games as a member of the squad.

1976 he won the Asian Cup in Iran with the Iranian team, Nouraei was one of the first XI in the final match against Kuwait.

Career statistics

International goals

References

External links
Planet World Cup
RSSSF
Kayhan Publishing, Special Edition: 30 years of History of Persepolis Soccer Club: From Shahin til Piroozi.

1954 births
Living people
Iranian footballers
Homa F.C. players
1976 AFC Asian Cup players
1978 FIFA World Cup players
AFC Asian Cup-winning players
Iran international footballers
Persepolis F.C. players
Olympic footballers of Iran
Footballers at the 1976 Summer Olympics
Association football forwards
Sportspeople from Tehran